Myrmecophagy is a feeding behavior defined by the consumption of termites or ants, particularly as pertaining to those animal species whose diets are largely or exclusively composed of said insect types. The two habits often overlap, as both of these eusocial insect types often live in large, densely populated nests requiring similar adaptations in the animal species that exploit them.

In vertebrates

Myrmecophagy is found in a number of land-dwelling vertebrate taxa, including reptiles and amphibians (horned lizards and blind snakes, narrow-mouthed toads of the family Microhylidae and poison frogs of the Dendrobatidae), a number of New World bird species (Antbirds, Antthrushes, Antpittas, flicker of genus Colaptes), and several mammalian groups (anteaters, aardvarks, aardwolves, armadillos, echidnas, numbats, pangolins, and sloth bears, as well as many other groups of living and extinct mammals).

The extinct alvarezsaurids, a group of theropod dinosaurs from the Cretaceous period, have been interpreted as myrmecophagous, with their short, robustly built arms with a single claw being interpreted as being used to break into colonial insect nests.

Otherwise unrelated mammals that specialize in myrmecophagy often display similar adaptations for this niche. Many have powerful forelimbs and claws adapted to excavating the nests of ant or termite colonies from the earth or from wood or under bark. Most have reduced teeth and some have reduced jaws as well. Practically all have long, sticky tongues. In the nineteenth and early twentieth century many zoologists saw these shared features as evidence of relatedness, and accordingly they regarded the various species as single order of Mammalia, the Edentata. It quite early became clear that such a classification was hard to sustain, and there was a growing trend to see the features as examples of convergent evolution. For example, at the start of the 20th century Frank Evers Beddard, writing in The Cambridge Natural History, Vol 10, Mammalia, having discussed some discrepant features, said: "The fact is, that we have here a polymorphic order which contains in all probability representatives of at least two separate orders. We have at present a very few, and these perhaps highly modified, descendants of a large and diverse group of mammals."

In invertebrates
Generally speaking, ants are little fed upon because they tend to be dangerous, small, and rich in distasteful and harmful compounds, so much so that ant mimicry is a common strategy of defence among invertebrates. Ants also are plentiful, so members of several invertebrate taxa do feed on ants. Such ant predators include some spiders, such as species in the family Salticidae (jumping spiders),  spiders in the family Oecobiidae and the family Theridiidae. While exclusive myrmecophagy is not very common, there are some striking examples, such as the Australian ant-slayer spider Euryopis umbilicata that feeds almost exclusively on one species of ant. Other examples include some myrmecomorphs (ant mimics) and myrmecophiles.  Myrmecomorphs are Batesian mimics. They gain
protection against predators, and abundant food.

Various species of the Hemipteran suborder Heteroptera, in the family Reduviidae feed largely or exclusively on ants. Examples include the genera Paredocla and Acanthaspis

Some insects that feed on ants do so because they are opportunistic predators of small insects that run on the ground surface, of which ants are a large proportion. Remarkable examples of convergent evolution are certain species of the Neuropteran family Myrmeleontidae, largely Myrmeleon, the so-called ant lions, and the Dipteran family Vermileonidae, in particular the genera Lampromyia and Vermilio, the so-called worm lions. Both of them are regarded with interest for their habit of constructing conical pit traps in fine sand or dust, at the bottom of which they await prey that has fallen in. Both throw sand to interfere with any attempts on the part of the prey to escape.

Myrmecophagy takes more forms than just eating adult ants; the later instars of caterpillars of many butterflies in the family Lycaenidae enter the nests of particular species of ants and eat the ants' eggs and larvae. Larvae of some species of flies, such as the genus Microdon in the family Syrphidae spend their entire immature lives in the nests of ants, feeding largely or entirely on the ant brood. Some beetles specialise in feeding on the brood of particular species of ants. An example is the coccinellid Diomus; larvae of Diomus thoracicus in French Guiana specialise in the nests of the invasive ant species Wasmannia auropunctata.

One of the predominant predators on ants are other ants, especially the army ants and their close relatives. Some ants such as the raider ant Oocerea biroi and the new world army ant Nomamyrmex esenbecki are obligate myrmecophages, that is they eat exclusively other ants, while other ants like the infamous swarm-raiding Eciton burchellii eat more or less all arthropods in their paths, including any ants they can get. Primarily it is the highly nutritious pupae and larvae, rather than the adult ants, that are taken and eaten.

References

Carnivory
Ants
Termites